The Continentals were a Chinese American street gang that was prominent in New York City's Chinatown in the early 1960s.

Origins

The Continentals were created in 1961 by ABCs (American Born Chinese) high school students for self preservation to protect Chinese students from attacks from other ethnic groups, such as Puerto Ricans, Italians and African Americans. One example was when African American Gangs from the Smith Projects where one continental remembers when he used to pass by they would throw dirty diapers out the window and call him Chinaman.
The Continentals were the first ABCs (American Born Chinese) gang created in Chinatown Manhattan. In the early sixties several "juk tuk" clubs began to appear. Foremost were the Continentals, a bunch who spent a good deal of time looking into the mirror, practicing complex handshakes. The gang got their name from ripping of insignia from Lincoln Continentals cars.

Criminal history
Prior to immigration law in 1965 the only active Chinese street gang were The Continentals. There crimes were mostly non violent mostly vandalism but never had a reputation of violent crimes and not having a money making purpose.

Membership
The Continentals were a large gang with up to 100 members. After some time they had trouble recruiting because of the small number of native-born Chinese, where as new gangs such as the White Eagles and Chung Yee were able to recruit new members such as immigrants from Hong Kong and mainland China.

Legacy
The Continentals will be remembered as members that as a gang that did have a relationship of non violence to the community as compared to the gangs that followed. 
For example, one ex member became a Chinatown social worker who used to be a former continental to try and make a truce with the Chinatown gangs so they could get a government grant who tried to give up their evil ways and get decent jobs which happened to be a scam to con the Federal government in grant money.

The Continentals inability to ingrate with a tong also diminished its status within the community leaving the gang active for only 3 years.
They will remembered as being created to combat other ethnic gangs and racism of their time. In the late sixties with the 1965 immigration law new gangs started to merge in Chinatown succeeding the legacy left behind by the Continentals and known for less violence in comparison to the new gangs that were to come like the Ghost Shadows and Flying Dragons that were extremely more violent and had the principal objective of racketeering.

References

Former gangs in New York City
Chinese-American gangs
1960s in New York City
1961 establishments in New York City
Chinatown, Manhattan